Arthroleptis aureoli, also known as the Freetown long-fingered frog or Mount Aureol squeaker, is a species of frog in the family Arthroleptidae. It is found in the Freetown Peninsula, Sierra Leone (the region of its type locality), and in northern Sierra Leone and into the adjacent Guinea.

Habitat and conservation
Arthroleptis aureoli occurs in forests, plantations, and rural gardens near forests at elevations below . It lives on rocks, often near streams and rivers. Development is direct (i.e., there is no free-living larval stage).

This species is believed to be declining because of ongoing declines in the extent and quality of its habitat. The habitat is threatened by the expansion of human settlements, small-scale agriculture and grazing activities, artisanal gold mining, wildfires, and even hydroelectric dams. It is present in the Western Area Peninsula Forest National Park, and its range might extend into the Loma Mountains National Park, both in Sierra Leone.

References

aureoli
Frogs of Africa
Amphibians of West Africa
Fauna of Guinea
Fauna of Sierra Leone
Amphibians described in 1964
Taxa named by Arne Schiøtz
Taxonomy articles created by Polbot